This is a list of the schools in Japan that have varsity football teams and are overseen by the Japan American Football Association.

There are a total of eight leagues  divided between East Japan (東日本) and West Japan (西日本). Each league has at least two tiers of program. The top or first tier is the only one that sends teams to the post season tournament. The remaining teams are in lower tiers that can not compete in the post season, but may play their way into the top tier via promotion and relegation.

East (東日本)
The leagues comprising the East are:
 Kantoh Collegiate American Football Association
 Hokkaido American Football Association
 Tohoku Collegiate American Football Association

West (西日本)
The leagues comprising the West are:
 Chushikoku Collegiate American Football Association
 Hokuriku Collegiate American Football League
 Kansai Collegiate American Football League
 Kyūshū Collegiate American Football Association
 Tokai Collegiate American Football Association

References

See also

List of NCAA Division I FBS football programs
List of NCAA Division I FCS football programs
List of NCAA Division II football programs
List of NCAA Division III football programs
List of NAIA football programs
List of community college football programs
List of NCAA Institutions with club football teams
List of defunct college football teams
List of Mexican collegiate American football programs

American football in Japan